This is a list of members of the Northern Territory Legislative Assembly from 1987 to 1990.

 Millner Labor MLA Terry Smith resigned on 21 November 1991. Labor candidate Ken Parish won the resulting by-election on 7 December.
 Arafura Labor MLA Stan Tipiloura died on 20 September 1992. Labor candidate Maurice Rioli won the resulting by-election on 7 November.
 Brennan CLP MLA Max Ortmann lost preselection prior to the 1994 election and became an independent.

See also
1990 Northern Territory general election

Members of Northern Territory parliaments by term
20th-century Australian politicians